Sherrie is an English female given name. It might come from the French chérie, meaning darling (from the past participle of the verb chérir, to cherish). 

It may refer to:

 Sherrie Hewson (born 1950), English actress
 Sherrie Levine (born 1947), photographer and conceptual artist
 Sherrie Rollins Westin, Executive Vice President and Chief Marketing Officer of Sesame Workshop
 Sherrie Schneider, author
 Sherrie Eugene (born 1964), English TV presenter

See also

 Sherrie
 Chéri (disambiguation)
 Cheri (disambiguation)
 Cherie
 Cherri (disambiguation)
 Cherrie
 Cherry (disambiguation)
 Shari (disambiguation)
 Sheri (disambiguation)
 Sherie
 Sherri (name)
 Sherry (disambiguation)
 Shery